William Russell Hardie (May 20, 1904 – July 21, 1973) was an American film actor. 

He appeared in The Costello Case, Broadway to Hollywood, Stage Mother, Christopher Bean, As the Earth Turns, Men in White, Operator 13, Murder in the Private Car, Pursued, Hell in the Heavens, The Band Plays On, Sequoia, West Point of the Air, Speed Devils, In Old Kentucky, The Harvester, Down to the Sea, Meet Nero Wolfe, Killer at Large, Camille, The Frogmen, The Whistle at Eaton Falls, Cop Hater, Fail Safe and The Group.

He died on July 21, 1973, in Clarence, New York at age 69.

Filmography

References

External links
 
 

1904 births
1973 deaths
20th-century American male actors
American male film actors